Sydney Ann Cook (born 1948) is an American author of contemporary and historical romance novels, who wrote under the pen names Sara Chance, Sherry Carr, Sydney Ann Clary and Lacey Dancer.

She won the Romantic Times Career Achievement Award in 1991–1992 for Series Romance Love and Laughter.  Romantic Times awarded her a second Career Achievement Award in 1996 for Series Romantic Adventure. Romantic Times described Dancer's novel Silke as "a dazzling, richly intense love story brimming with fascinating characters, sharply imaginative plotting and irresistible romantic suspense".

Many of her early books were published by Meteor in their Kismet line of category romances.   The final title in her Pippa series was ready to be shipped to bookstores when Meteor suddenly folded.  The orphaned novel, Many Faces of Love, had difficulty finding a new home, partly because the heroine was over 40, which was rare in the romance novel genre.  Dancer finally created her own publishing company, Clear Ice Publishing, to release the novel in mass market paperback form.

Bibliography

As Sara Chance

Single novels
Her Golden Eyes (1983)
Home at Last (1983)
This Wildfire Magic (1983)
A Touch of Passion (1985)
Look Beyond Tomorrow (1986)
Where the Wandering Ends (1987)
Double Solitaire (1987)
Shadow Watch (1988)
To Tame the Wind (1988)
With a Little Spice (1989)
Fire in the Night (1989)

Southern ComfortSeries
Southern Comfort (1988)
Woman in the Shadows (1989)
Eye of the Storm (1989)

As Sherry Carr

Single novel
Let Passion Soar  (1983)

Non-Fiction
Care Giving: Real Life Answers (2014)

Single novels
Undercover Affair (1986)
The Duchess and the Devil (1988)
Misfit Match (1989)

As Lacey Dancer

Single novel
Sunlight on Shadows (1991)

Starke-McGuire
Silent Enchantment (1990)
Diamond On Ice (1991)
13 Days of Luck (1991)
Flight of the Swan (1992)
Baby Makes Five (1992)
Forever Joy (1993)
Lightning Strikes Twice (1993)
His Woman's Gift (1993)
Many Faces of Love (2003)

St. James Saga
Silke (1996)
Caprice (1996)
Leora (1996)
Noelle (1996)

Pippa Series
Choices (2013)
Diamond and Ice (2016)

Live Oak Series
Chase the Fire (2015)
Playing with Fire (2017)
Strike the Fire (2018)
Catch the Fire (2020)
Light the Fire (2021)

Truth Series
Truth Kills (2019)
Truth Tells (Summer 2020)

References

Lacey Dancer a.k.a. Sydney Ann Clary author website: https://laceydancer.com

1948 births
American romantic fiction writers
Living people